The 1888 Cincinnati Red Stockings season was a season in American baseball. The team finished in fourth place in the American Association with a record of 80–54, 11.5 games behind the St. Louis Browns.

Regular season 

Cincinnati retained manager Gus Schmelz, who led the team to a franchise record 81 wins in 1887.  The Red Stockings were quiet during the off-season, as pitcher Lee Viau, who signed his first professional contract, was the only major signing by the team.

John Reilly had the best season of his career, hitting .321 while leading the league with 13 home runs and 103 RBI, as he became the first Red Stocking to crack 100 RBI in a season.  He also had 83 stolen bases.  Hugh Nicol hit only .239; however, he once again stole over 100 bases, finishing the season with 103.  Nicol and Reilly tied for the team high with 112 runs scored.

On the mound, Lee Viau led Cincinnati with 27 wins and a 2.65 ERA in 42 starts.  Tony Mullane and Mike Smith each finished with over 20 wins as well, with 26 and 22 respectively.

The Red Stockings began the season red hot, as they had a 12–5 record before winning 10 games in a row to be 22–5, three games ahead of the second place St. Louis Browns.  Cincinnati then fell into a slump, going 5–16 in their next 21 games to fall into fourth place, seven games out of first.  The Red Stockings remained in the pennant race until late in the season. However, the team finished the year in fourth place with an 80–54 record, 11.5 games behind the first place Browns.

Season standings

Record vs. opponents

Roster

Player stats

Batting

Starters by position 
Note: Pos = Position; G = Games played; AB = At bats; H = Hits; Avg. = Batting average; HR = Home runs; RBI = Runs batted in

Other batters 
Note: G = Games played; AB = At bats; H = Hits; Avg. = Batting average; HR = Home runs; RBI = Runs batted in

Pitching

Starting pitchers 
Note: G = Games pitched; IP = Innings pitched; W = Wins; L = Losses; ERA = Earned run average; SO = Strikeouts

Relief pitchers 
Note: G = Games pitched; W = Wins; L = Losses; SV = Saves; ERA = Earned run average; SO = Strikeouts

References

External links
1888 Cincinnati Red Stockings season at Baseball Reference

Cincinnati Reds seasons
Cincinnati Red Stockings season
Cincinnati Reds